Cyrtodactylus markuscombaii, also known commonly as the striped gecko, is a species of gecko, a lizard in the family Gekkonidae. The species is endemic to eastern Nepal.

Etymology
The specific name, markuscombaii, is in honor of Markus Comba (born 1956), who is a Swiss antiquarian bookseller, book restorer, and naturalist.

Distribution
Known only from a single locality in E Nepal (Ilam; altitude 1,200-1,300 m. Possibly a Nepalese endemite.

Reproduction
C. markuscombaii is oviparous.

References

Further reading
Darevsky, Ilya S.; Helfenberger, Notker; Orlov, Nikolai L.; Shah, Karan (1998). "Two New Species of the Genus Gonydactylus (Sauria: Gekkonidae) from Eastern Nepal". Russian Journal of Herpetology 4 (2): 89–93. (Gonydactylus markuscombaii, new species).

Cyrtodactylus
Reptiles described in 1998
Taxa named by Ilya Darevsky